Susan F. Filan (born August 24, 1959) is Senior Legal Analyst for MSNBC, former prosecutor for the State of Connecticut, and a trial lawyer.

Early career
In 1991, she began her career as a criminal defense attorney for a legal aid clinic, in New Haven, CT, representing indigent defendants charged with crimes. She then went into private practice where she specialized in criminal defense and matrimonial law at both the trial and appellate level in state and federal court. In 1998, Filan was hired by the State Attorney's office for The Division of Criminal Justice which consists of the Office of the Chief State's Attorney and the State's Attorneys for each of the 13 Judicial Districts in Connecticut. They, along with Assistant State's Attorneys, are Connecticut's prosecutors—the public officials known in many other states, and in TV lore, as District Attorneys, or the "D.A."  Filan was one of the more than 500 prosecutors, inspectors and administrative and support staff who are responsible for the investigation and prosecution of crime in Connecticut.  She was assigned to the Gang and Continuing Crime Unit. In 2003, Filan transferred to the Judicial District of Fairfield at Bridgeport as an Assistant State's Attorney (prosecutor).

TV Legal Analyst
In 2005, Filan began providing commentary on MSNBC, Fox News, CNN, Court TV, ABC News, CBS News, and BBC News in 2005 on several high-profile cases including Michael Jackson and Scott Peterson. In May 2005, Filan resigned as a prosecutor to pursue a career in media when she was hired by NBC News and MSNBC to provide exclusive legal analysis of the Michael Jackson trial. She covered the trial from Santa Maria, California. After Jackson's acquittal on all charges, Filan returned home and began providing legal analysis for MSNBC and occasionally appeared on NBC. In 2006, she was promoted to MSNBC Senior Analyst.

In addition to appearing as an analyst on MSNBC's daytime and primetime programs, Filan also has served as a guest host for "The Abrams Report." Filan has been quoted in print media around the world.

She is a regular contributor to Women in Crime Ink, described by the Wall Street Journal as "a blog worth reading."

Credentials
Filan is admitted to practice before the Supreme Court of the United States, the United States Court of Appeals for the Second Circuit, the United States District Court for the District of Connecticut and the Courts of the State of Connecticut. She has a column on MSNBC.com called the Filan Files.

She was the past president of the Board of Quinnipiac University School of Law Alumni Association and an Alternate on the Local Grievance Panel for the Judicial District of New Haven.

Education

 Quinnipiac College School Of Law, Hamden, CT
 Juris Doctor, May 1991; Merit Scholar, 1990–91
 IOLTA Scholar, 1990–91; American Jurisprudence Award, Trial Practice, 1991
 University of Michigan, Ann Arbor, MI
 M.A., Anthropology, 1986
 Teaching Assistant; Research Assistant; Research Grant Recipient
 Admitted to Ph.D. Program in Anthropology
 University of Michigan, Ann Arbor, MI
B.A., with Distinction, Anthropology, 1981
Graduate of National Institute of Trial Advocacy’s Ten Day Regional Program
Graduate of National Advocacy Center Trial Advocacy Program
Graduate of Top Gun Training Program, Sea Girt, New Jersey

References

External links
Website

Living people
1959 births
Connecticut lawyers
American television reporters and correspondents
American television news anchors
MSNBC people
CNN people
American women television journalists
American women lawyers
American lawyers
University of Michigan College of Literature, Science, and the Arts alumni
Quinnipiac University alumni